Hawsha (Hǔsheh, also Husha) was a Palestinian village located  east of Haifa, about  above sea level. 

During the late Roman period, Hawsha was the site of the ancient Jewish town of Usha, which was the seat of the Sanhedrin. Ruins on the site include ancient mosaics and tombs. The village had a Maqam (shrine) for Nabi Hushan.

In 1945, it had a population of 580 inhabitants, 400 of whom were Arab Muslims and 180 of whom were Jewish. The built-up area of the village was 50 dunums, and 717 dunums were used for agriculture. All but 7 dunums of public land were owned by Jews by this time.

Hawsha was depopulated during the 1947–1948 Civil War in Mandatory Palestine on April 16, 1948 as part of the Battle of Ramat Yohanan.

History
The village was located on a low hilly area between the plain of Haifa and Marj ibn Amr (Jezreel Valley) and situated on an east-west axis. To the west, lay a wide valley (Wadi Husheh) that was the dividing area between it and the neighboring village of Khirbat al-Kasayir. Leopold Zunz, and researchers from the Palestine Exploration Fund (PEF), among others, have connected Hawsha to the biblical village of Usha, a border settlement of the Israelite tribe of Asher (Book of Joshua 29:19) and the seat of the Sanhedrin after 135 AD.

Hawsha was mentioned as part of the domain of the Crusaders during the hudna between the Crusaders based in Acre and the Mamluk sultan al-Mansur (Qalawun) declared in 1283.

Ottoman era
Under the rule of the Ottoman Empire, Hawsha's lands belonged to the inhabitants of Shefa 'Amr. The village contained many ancient ruins, parts of which were used to build some village structures, including a shrine known as Maqam Nabi Hushan, a well (Bir Husheh), and tombstones. William M. Thomson, writing in 1859, identifies the shrine as Neby Hǔshǎ, which he translates as the "Prophet Joshua," and describes it as a "white-domed mazar [...] a place of great resort." In the Survey of Western Palestine (1838), it is noted that the Prophet Hosea is said to be buried near "Kh. Husheh." Also in the village was a mosaic floor from an ancient building.

V. Guerin, who visited the site in 1875, provides a lengthy description of the ancient ruins in evidence throughout the area. He states his belief that this is the site of ancient Usha and speculates that the ruins of a finely built edifice in which there are the remnants of many columns was a synagogue. He then says a synagogue of Ousha should be constructed if there is not already such a place of worship in the vicinity. Also noting the presence of the domed wali of Neby Houchan consecrated to the prophet Hosea, he cites the Muslim tradition that this prophet is here interred. He describes the shrine as being constructed of what appear to ancient stones, with what seems to be a mihrab at its base, noting there are shreds of clothing strewn and floating about it.

In an 1890 quarterly statement for the PEF, the ancient ruins of Hawsha are described as follows: "This ruin [...] must have been an important place, to judge from the mass of building stones and the fragments of columns lying about. Now that the grass is dried up a regular city wall can be traced. On the main road running from the well towards the ruin some fine capitals are lying about, which have a close resemblance to those which on other sites have been stated to be remains of synagogues. The shafts of columns lying about generally have the basis or capital worked out of the same piece, have a diameter of 18 inches, and are composed of Nari limestone."

In the same report, it is noted that the water of Bir Husheh, located at the western edge of the ruin, is praised by the locals for its "excellence." Older inhabitants relayed how Jezzar Pasha and Abdullah Pasha, former Governors of 'Acca, had their drinking water supplied from the well, and tended to camp by the well during their trips to the interior. The inscription was discovered by natives of Shefa 'Amr who showed to Père Julien, a priest from Beirut, who in turn shared it with Gottlieb Schumacher of the  PEF.

British Mandate era
In the 1922 census of Palestine conducted by the British Mandate authorities, Husheh  had  a total population of  165, all Muslims,  increasing in the 1931 census  202, still all  Muslims, in a total of 53 houses.

Hawsha was categorized as a hamlet in the Mandate-era Palestine Index Gazetteer. The houses were clustered around the water cistern at the center of the village. The Muslim inhabitants shared a cemetery with Khirbat al-Kasayir. The villagers were agriculturalists and pastoralists who raised livestock. Beans were the most important agricultural product. The agricultural area of the village lay to the southwest. A small area north of the built up part of the village was planted with olive and fruit trees.

In the 1945 statistics  Hawsha was counted among  Shefa-'Amr  suburbs, and it was noted with a population of  400 Muslims.

1948 war and aftermath
On 11 April 1948, Fawzi al-Qawuqji ordered the ALA's Druze Battalion to begin operations around Kibbutz Ramat Yohanan. The Battalion occupied the semi-abandoned villages of Hawsha and Khirbat al-Kasayir and began to shell Ramat Yohanan and harass the neighboring settlements. The Haganah responded and on the night 15–16 April, what is known as the Battle of Ramat Yohanan, after the Jewish settlement bloc close to where it was fought, also known by Palestinian historians as the 'Battle of al-Husha and al-Kayasr', after the Palestinian villages that were conquered by the Haganah forces by the battle's end, ensued. According to Morris, "Wailing refugees fled to Shafa-Amr, spreading rumors of Jewish atrocities". According to Benvenisti, The Arab inhabitants who remained in the village following its conquest were evicted in the months following the end of the 1948 Arab-Israeli war, as were the inhabitants of neighboring villages whose lands were coveted for Jewish settlement.

A volunteer effort to restore the cemetery of the depopulated village of Hawsha was undertaken in 1994 and overseen by Al-Aqsa Association.

Footnotes

References

Bibliography

 (p. 671)

External links
Welcome To Hawsha
Hawsha,  Zochrot
Survey of Western Palestine, Map 5:      IAA, Wikimedia commons
Hawsha, from the Khalil Sakakini Cultural Center

Arab villages depopulated prior to the 1948 Arab–Israeli War
District of Haifa
Islamic shrines in Israel